The 2019–20 season of the Slovenian Women's League (Slovenian: Prva slovenska ženska nogometna liga) or simply 1. SŽNL was the 28th season of Slovenia's premier women's football league. It ran from 18 August 2019 to 7 March 2020, when play was suspended. In May 2020 the season was cancelled due to the COVID-19 pandemic in Slovenia. The executive board of the Football Association of Slovenia decided that defending champions and unbeaten league-leaders ŽNK Pomurje would take the 2021–22 UEFA Women's Champions League place.

Teams

League table

Season statistics

Top scorers

References

External links
Statistics at Football Association of Slovenia 

Slovenian Women's League
Slovenia
2019–20 in Slovenian football